Balıkesirspor is a Turkish club based in Balıkesir. Established in 1966, the football team played in the Süper Lig after achieving promotion having finished as runners-up of the TFF First League in 2013–14. The team's previous promotion was 40 years before that. Their stadium, the all-seater Balıkesir Atatürk Stadium, has a capacity of 15,800.

History 
Balıkesirspor was founded on 6 June 1966 and started to compete in Turkish Second Football League in 1967–68 season. On 20 August 1967, it played its first competitive match against Malatyaspor and won 3–1. Kadir Gürsoy scored the first goal of the club in that match. The club won its first title in 1974–75 season under the management of Rıdvan Kösemihal and promoted to Turkish First Football League, the top level of Turkish football. Despite being 4th in the first half of the season, Balıkesirspor finished its first season in the top level in the last place and was relegated to Second League.

After competing in Second League for 10 seasons in a row, the club was relegated to Third League, the third level of Turkish football at that time. In the 1991–92 season, Balıkesirspor earned promotion after finishing first in Third League Group 7.

Players

Current squad

Managers

 Selahaddin Dincel (June 15, 2010 – Dec 6, 2010)
 Mesut Dilsöz (Jan 10, 2011 – Dec 9, 2012)
 İsmail Ertekin (Dec 13, 2012 – Nov 24, 2014)
 Kemal Özdeş (Dec 4, 2014– Apr 26, 2015)
 Cihat Arslan (Apr 27, 2014– Jun 12, 2015)
 Erkan Sözeri (Jun 14, 2015– Oct 5, 2015)
 Fikret Yılmaz (Nov 10, 2015– Mar 7, 2016)

Competitions
1966–75: Turkey Second League
1975–76: Turkey First League
1976–86: Turkey Second League
1986–92: Turkey Third League
1992–97: Turkey Second League
1997–01: Turkey Third League
2001–06: Amatör Futbol Ligleri
2006–10: TFF Third League
2010–13: TFF Second League
2013–14: TFF First League
2014–15: Süper Lig
2015–22: TFF First League
2022–: TFF Second League

Honours

 1974–75: TFF Second League Champion
 1992–93: TFF Third League 7th Group Champion
 2012–13: TFF Second League White Group Champion

References

External links
Official website
Balıkesirspor on TFF.org

 
Football clubs in Turkey
Association football clubs established in 1966
Multi-sport clubs in Turkey
Balıkesir Province
1966 establishments in Turkey
Süper Lig clubs